The Archdiocese of Cincinnati is a Latin Church ecclesiastical jurisdiction or archdiocese that covers the southwest region of the U.S. state of Ohio, including the greater Cincinnati and Dayton metropolitan areas. The Archbishop of Cincinnati is Dennis Marion Schnurr. The Archdiocese of Cincinnati is the metropolitan see of its province, with five suffragan dioceses.

Geography

In total, the Archdiocese of Cincinnati encompasses 230 parishes in 19 counties, with the total membership of baptized Catholics around 500,000. The archdiocese administers 110 associated parochial schools and diocesan elementary schools. The mother church is the Cathedral Basilica of St. Peter in Chains, located at the corner of 8th and Plum Streets in Downtown Cincinnati.

Cincinnati is the metropolis of the Ecclesiastical Province of Cincinnati, which encompasses the entire state of Ohio and is composed of the archdiocese and its five suffragan dioceses: Cleveland, Columbus, Steubenville, Toledo, and Youngstown.

The Archdiocese of Cincinnati is bordered by the Diocese of Toledo to the north, the Diocese of Columbus to the east, the Diocese of Covington to the south, and the Archdiocese of Indianapolis and Diocese of Lafayette to the west.

History
Pope Pius VII erected the Diocese of Cincinnati, then constituting the whole of the state of Ohio, on 19 June 1821, in territory taken from the Diocese of Bardstown.

The diocese lost all portions of its territory to the north of latitude 40' 41 on 23 April 1847, when Pope Pius IX erected the Diocese of Cleveland.  However, this line cut through multiple counties, leading the bishops of Cleveland and Cincinnati to agree that:the counties of Mercer, Auglaze, Hardin, Marion, Morrow, Knox, Tuscarawas, Carroll, Jefferson, which belong to the diocese of Cincinnati shall constitute the northern boundary of the diocese of Cincinnati. And that all the counties north of those just named, shall compose the diocese of Cleveland. Holmes county, which is for the greater part south of the line above traced, is by mutual consent, assigned to the diocese of Cleveland. On July 19, 1850, Pope Pius IX elevated the diocese to an archdiocese with the dioceses of Louisville, Detroit, and  Cleveland as suffragans.  The Diocese of Columbus was erected from "the territory from the Ohio River to the Scioto River ... together with the Counties of Franklin, Delaware and Morrow." on March 3, 1868. Finally, in 1945, nine counties on the eastern edge of the archdiocese were annexed to the Diocese of Columbus, resulting in the archdiocese's current geographic boundaries.

Parish development 
Cincinnati's first church, named Christ Church, was organized in 1819, just beyond the city boundaries.  Soon additional parishes were formed in Dayton, Hamilton, and St. Martin, Brown County. Emmanuel Thienpont was a Belgian-born American Catholic priest who was a pioneer of parish organization in the Archdiocese of Cincinnati.

As the number of German Catholic immigrants increased, Holy Trinity Church was formed in Cincinnati, the first Catholic parish for Germans west of the Allegheny Mountains. By the mid-nineteenth century, a system of national parishes, especially evident in Cincinnati and Dayton, took shape, providing separate churches for Italian, Hungarian, Polish, Lithuanian and Syrian Catholics. 

Ethnic-specific parishes continued to be formed until World War I when Archbishop Moeller successfully petitioned Rome for an end to national parishes and permission to formulate parish boundaries.

Religious orders
The Archdiocese of Cincinnati has been served by numerous women's religious orders, including the Sisters of Charity, Dominican Sisters of St. Cecilia, Precious Blood Sisters, Sisters of Notre Dame de Namur, Sisters of Mercy, Little Sisters of the Poor, Ursulines, and Sisters of St. Joseph. The congregations and orders of male religious in the archdiocese include the Order of Preachers (Dominicans), Order of Friars Minor (Franciscans), Society of Jesus (Jesuits), Missionaries of the Precious Blood, Society of Mary (Marianists), Comboni Missionaries, Glenmary Home Missioners, and Holy Ghost Fathers (Spiritans). Members of these communities staff schools and parishes and serve in a variety of social service roles. 

Many of the religious communities in the archdiocese owe their presence in part to Sarah Worthington King Peter, a prominent Catholic convert and philanthropist, who in the mid-nineteenth century helped finance the relocation of sisters from Europe to Cincinnati.

Sexual abuse scandals

In November 2003, following a sexual abuse scandal and two-year investigation by the Hamilton County prosecutor's office, Archbishop Daniel Pilarczyk entered a plea of nolo contendere regarding five misdemeanor charges of failure to report allegations of child molestation. The court rendered no criminal judgment on the allegations themselves, only on the diocese's failure to report the allegations. The Archdiocese of Cincinnati was also fined $10,000 after being found guilty of failing to report sexually abusive priests in the 1970s and 1980s.

In August 2019, it was announced that Auxiliary Bishop Joseph R. Binzer, the archdiocese's Vicar General who was blamed for failing to inform the Archbishop of Cincinnati about a series of allegations that a priest had engaged in inappropriate behavior with teenage boys, was removed from his position as head of priest personnel, while the archdiocese begins its own investigation. Geoff Drew, the priest who Binzer had protected, had previously faced allegations in other parishes. On August 19, 2019, local authorities arrested Drew and charged him with nine counts of sex abuse.  In May 2020, the Vatican accepted Binzer's resignation as auxiliary bishop.

Parish consolidation
In 2021, the archdiocese began a process of parish consolidation known as "Beacons of Light". Parishes will be grouped into "parish families" overseen by a single pastor. In the long term, each parish family is expected to merge its parishes into a single parish. Reorganization plans are scheduled to be finalized in 2022.

Churches

Bishops

Bishops of Cincinnati
 Edward Fenwick (1822–1833)
 John Baptist Purcell (1833–1850), elevated to Archbishop

Archbishops of Cincinnati
 John Baptist Purcell (1850–1883)
 William Henry Elder (1883–1903; coadjutor archbishop 1880-1883)
 Henry K. Moeller (1903–1925; coadjutor archbishop 1903)  - Joseph Chartrand (Appointed 1925, did not take effect)
 John Timothy McNicholas (1925–1950)
 Karl Joseph Alter (1950–1969)
 Paul Francis Leibold (1969–1972)
 Joseph Bernardin (1972–1982), appointed Archbishop of Chicago (Cardinal in 1983)
 Daniel Edward Pilarczyk (1982–2009)
 Dennis Marion Schnurr (2009–present; coadjutor archbishop 2008-2009)

Former auxiliary bishops of Cincinnati
 Sylvester Horton Rosecrans (1861–1868), appointed Bishop of Columbus
 Joseph H. Albers (1929–1937), appointed Bishop of Lansing
 George John Rehring (1937–1950), appointed Bishop of Toledo
 Clarence George Issenmann (1954–1957), appointed Bishop of Columbus
 Paul Francis Leibold (1958–1966), appointed Bishop of Evansville and later Archbishop of Cincinnati (see above)
 Edward Anthony McCarthy (1965–1969), appointed Bishop of Phoenix and later Coadjutor Archbishop and Archbishop of Miami
 Nicholas Thomas Elko (1970–1985)
 Daniel Edward Pilarczyk (1974–1982) appointed Archbishop of Cincinnati (see above)
 James Henry Garland (1984–1992) appointed Bishop of Marquette
 Carl Kevin Moeddel (1993–2007)
 Joseph R. Binzer (2011–2020)

Other affiliated bishops
The following men began their service as priests in Cincinnati before being appointed bishops elsewhere (years in parentheses refer to their years in Cincinnati):
 John Martin Henni, Bishop and later Archbishop of Milwaukee (1829–1843)
 Henry Damian Juncker, Bishop of Alton (1834–1857)
 Joshua Maria Young, Bishop of Erie (1838–1853)
 John Baptist Lamy, Vicar Apostolic of New Mexico and later Bishop and Archbishop of Santa Fe (1838–1850)
 James Frederick Bryan Wood, Coadjutor Bishop and later Bishop and Archbishop of Philadelphia (1844–1857)
 John Henry Luers, Bishop of Fort Wayne (1846–1857)
 Caspar Henry Borgess, Coadjutor Bishop and later Bishop of Detroit (1848–1870)
 Richard Gilmour, Bishop of Cleveland (1852–1872)
 John Quinlan, Bishop of Mobile (1852–1859)
 Augustus Toebbe, Bishop of Covington (1854–1869)
 Joseph Gregory Dwenger, Bishop of Fort Wayne (1859–1867)
 Henry Richter, Bishop of Grand Rapids (1865–1883)
 Francis Beckman, appointed Bishop of Lincoln and later Archbishop of Dubuque (1902–1923)
 Urban John Vehr, Bishop and later Archbishop of Denver (1915–1931)
 Francis Augustine Thill, Bishop of Salina (1920–1938) (He became Bishop of Concordia in 1938, and was still in office there when the diocese name was changed from Concordia to Salina in 1944.)
 Anthony John King Mussio, Bishop of Steubenville (1935–1945)
 Christopher Cardone, Bishop of Auki later Archbishop of Honiara (1986-1988)
 John Joseph Kaising, Auxiliary Bishop for the Military Services, USA (1962–2000)
 Robert Daniel Conlon, Bishop of Steubenville and later Bishop of Joliet (1977–2002)
 Earl K. Fernandes, Bishop of Columbus (2002–2022)

Education

The Archdiocese of Cincinnati operates a large school system that is especially well-attended in the Cincinnati area. As of 2011, 43,641 students enroll in the Archdiocese's 115 schools, making it the sixth largest Catholic school system in the United States. In Hamilton County, where most private schools are run by the Archdiocese, nearly a quarter of students (36,684 as of 2007) attend private schools, a rate only second to St. Louis County, Missouri.

The 23 Catholic high schools in the region operate under varying degrees of archdiocesan control. Several are owned and operated by the archdiocese, while other interparochial schools are run by groups of parishes under archdiocesan supervision. Most of the interparochial and non-archdiocesan high schools are operated by religious institutes (as noted in the adjacent table). Most of the schools' athletic teams belong to the Greater Catholic League, which consists of a co-ed division, the Girls Greater Cincinnati League, and a division for all-male schools.

The archdiocese also includes 92 parochial and diocesan elementary schools, with a combined enrollment of 30,312, as of 2011 . These schools can be found in the urban and suburban areas of Cincinnati and Dayton, as well as some of the smaller towns within the archdiocesan boundaries. Each parochial school is owned and operated by its parish, rather than by the archdiocese's Catholic Schools Office. However, in March 2011, the archdiocese announced its intention of eventually unifying the schools under one school system. , the interim Superintendent of Catholic Schools is Susie Gibbons.

Five of the high schools are named after former archbishops of the diocese. A parochial elementary school in Dayton is also named after Archbishop Liebold.

The archdiocese sponsors the Athenaeum of Ohio – Mount St. Mary's Seminary of the West seminary in the Mount Washington neighborhood of Cincinnati.

Superintendents 
 Carl J. Ryan (1941–1964)
 Herman H. Kenning (1970–1974)
 Kathryn Ann Connelly (1983–2002)
 Joseph Kamis (2002–2010)
 Jim Riggs (2010–2015)
 Susie Gibbons (2015–present)

Media

Publications
The archdiocese publishes a monthly magazine, The Catholic Telegraph. It began publishing as a weekly newspaper in 1831, making it the first diocesan newspaper and second oldest Catholic newspaper in the United States, and converted to magazine format in 2020. Its defunct sister newspaper, Der Wahrheitsfreund, was the first German Catholic newspaper in the country.

The national magazine St. Anthony Messenger is published in Cincinnati by the Franciscan Friars with the archdiocese's ecclesiastical approval.

Radio stations

Several area Catholic radio stations, owned by separate entities, serve the Archdiocese:

WNOP 740 AM Licensed to Newport, Kentucky. "Sacred Heart Radio" plus a sister station
WHSS 89.5 FM in Hamilton, a repeater of WNOP.
WULM 1600 AM located in Springfield "Radio Maria" (based at KJMJ in Alexandria, Louisiana) serving portions of the Dayton area: a fifty-mile radius in the daytime. (ten mile radius at night) plus a sister station:
WHJM 88.7 FM licensed in Anna, transmitting from Botkins with a live studio located in nearby Minster which serves a forty-mile radius within the Upper Miami Valley and southern portions of the Lima area. Radio Maria also streams on the internet
 WLRU-LP 106.9 FM in Hillsboro.

Other stations reach into portions of the archdiocese:

WVSG 820 AM located in Columbus "St. Gabriel Radio" (the former WOSU (AM).
WRDF 106.3 FM licensed in Columbia City, Indiana with studio in Fort Wayne as "Redeemer Radio" which can be heard in portions of the northwestern corner of the Archdiocese, plus an audio stream.

See also
 Franciscan Media

References

External links
Archdiocese of Cincinnati Official Site

 
Cincinnati
Christianity in Cincinnati
Cincinnati
Cincinnati
1821 establishments in Ohio